Laura Gene Schwanger (born 1958) is a retired American Paralympic athlete and adaptive rower. She has competed at three Paralympic Games in track and field and returned twelve years later to compete in rowing at the 2008 Summer Paralympics. She is a four time Paralympic champion including six silver medals and one bronze medal in athletics and won a bronze medal in rowing.

After graduating from Washington Township High School, New Jersey in 1987, Schwanger joined the United States Army and became a meteorological observer. She was diagnosed with multiple sclerosis in 1981 while on active duty.

She took up athletics soon after then retired after the 1996 Summer Paralympics, she took up rowing in later 2006 after receiving chemotherapy for breast cancer.

She studied physical education at Glassboro State College, which became Rowan College during her time there. She earned a master's degree in counseling and psychology at Immaculata College.

References

Living people
1958 births
Track and field athletes from New Jersey
Track and field athletes from Philadelphia
Rowers from Philadelphia
American female discus throwers
American female javelin throwers
American pentathletes
American female shot putters
Paralympic track and field athletes of the United States
Paralympic rowers of the United States
Athletes (track and field) at the 1988 Summer Paralympics
Athletes (track and field) at the 1992 Summer Paralympics
Athletes (track and field) at the 1996 Summer Paralympics
Rowers at the 2008 Summer Paralympics
Medalists at the 1988 Summer Paralympics
Medalists at the 1992 Summer Paralympics
Medalists at the 1996 Summer Paralympics
Medalists at the 2008 Summer Paralympics
People from Washington Township, Gloucester County, New Jersey
People with multiple sclerosis
Sportspeople from Gloucester County, New Jersey
United States Army soldiers
Washington Township High School (New Jersey) alumni
21st-century American women
Rowan University alumni
Immaculata University alumni
Wheelchair discus throwers
Wheelchair javelin throwers
Wheelchair shot putters
Paralympic discus throwers
Paralympic javelin throwers
Paralympic shot putters